The Critics' Choice Television Award for Best Actress in a Movie/Miniseries is one of the award categories presented annually by the Critics' Choice Television Awards (BTJA) to recognize the work done by television actors. It was introduced in 2012. The winners are selected by a group of television critics that are part of the Broadcast Television Critics Association.

Winners and nominees

2010s

2020s

Multiple nominations
5 nominations
Jessica Lange

2 nominations
Carrie Coon
Felicity Huffman

See also
 Golden Globe Award for Best Actress – Miniseries or Television Film
 Primetime Emmy Award for Outstanding Lead Actress in a Limited Series or Movie
 Screen Actors Guild Award for Outstanding Performance by a Female Actor in a Miniseries or Television Movie

References

External links
 

Critics' Choice Television Awards
Television awards for Best Actress